K's Merchandise Mart, Inc. (usually known as simply K's Merchandise) was a catalog showroom department store based in Decatur, Illinois.  It offered furniture, jewelry, and general merchandise, including electronics, at 17 locations in 5 Midwestern states at the time of its closing.

K's was founded in 1957 by Raymond "Ray" Eldridge Sr. and his brother Kay.  However, by the 2000s, competition from big box stores had eroded K's sales for years, though it had 17 locations in Illinois, Indiana, Iowa, Missouri, and Kentucky.  Boston's Gordon Brothers Group took over the company from the original family, appointing Bill Weinstein as president.  After an attempt at turning around the stores' operations, K's announced on October 3, 2006, that it would liquidate and close to pay off its creditors in full.

K's Merchandise also operated four chain stores by the name of Bargains Only, with locations in Mt Zion, Champaign, Springfield and Peoria, Illinois.  These stores closely resembled a TJ Maxx style offering, with clothing, household goods and furniture.  They closed in front of their parent stores, with the final store closing in October 2006 in Mt. Zion.

References

Catalog showrooms
Retail companies established in 1957
Buildings and structures in Decatur, Illinois
Defunct department stores based in Illinois
Retail companies disestablished in 2007
Defunct companies based in Illinois
Companies based in Macon County, Illinois
1957 establishments in Illinois
2007 disestablishments in Illinois